Pinnaduwa Jayanthi Maha Vidyalaya (Sinhala: පින්නදුව ජයන්ති මහා විද්‍යාලය), Puhulhena, is a mixed school, with a student population exceeding 190 across 11 grades from primary to secondary classes, on a campus of  in the suburb of Pinnaduwa.  It was established on 21 October 1952, by the Pujya Ankokkawala Himarathana Thero. As of 2018, the academic staff of 23 was led by Mrs. U. G. Yamuna Priyanthi. Pinnaduwa Jayanthi Vidyalaya was started in village temple with ten students and one teacher.

Schools in Galle